Marshall Valley is a small valley in Antarctica, ice free except for Rivard Glacier at its western head. The valley is open to the Ross Sea to the east. It was named by the New Zealand Blue Glacier Party (1956–57) for Dr. Eric Marshall, surgeon and cartographer of the British Antarctic Expedition (1907–09), who accompanied Ernest Shackleton on his journey to within  of the South Pole.

References

Valleys of Victoria Land
McMurdo Dry Valleys